The 71-608 (in colloquial language KTM-8) is a Russian motor four-axle high-floor tramcar. These rail vehicles are produced by Ust'-Katav Vagon-building plant (UKVZ, УКВЗ, Усть-Катавский Вагоностроительный Завод имени С. М. Кирова - Russian abbreviature and full name). "KTM" means Kirov Motor Tramcar. This abbreviature was producer's official trademark before 1976, when new designation system for tram and subway rolling stock was introduced in the Soviet Union. After official abandoning KTM trademark it still lives in everyday conversations of Russian tram workers and enthusiasts.

Types 

 71-608 - two prototypes from 1988, used in Tver and Moscow. Withdrawn.
 71-608K - standard model 1991-1993
 71-608KM - standard model 1993 - 2000s

Gallery

External links 
 71-619 on Nizhny Novgorod TramSite (in Russian)

Soviet tram vehicles
tram vehicles of Russia

600 V DC multiple units